Politotdel is a rural locality (a khutor) in Dmitriyevskoye Rural Settlement of Koshekhablsky District, Adygea, Russia. The population was 230 as of 2018. There are 4 streets.

Geography 
Politotdel is located 14 km northwest of Koshekhabl (the district's administrative centre) by road. Dmitriyevsky is the nearest rural locality.

Ethnicity 
The khutor is inhabited by Tatars.

References 

Rural localities in Koshekhablsky District